is a railway station in Yufu, Ōita Prefecture, Japan. It is operated by JR Kyushu and is on the Kyudai Main Line.

Lines

Layout 
The station, which is unstaffed, consists of a side platform serving a single track on a side hill cutting. There is no station building, only a shelter on the platform and a toilet shed. A long ramp leads up to the platform from the access road.

Adjacent stations

History
This station was opened on the same day as one of several intermediate stations along the track. On 1 December 1922, the Daito Railway was nationalized and absorbed into Japanese Government Railways, (JGR) which closed the station. Subsequently, JGR reopened the station on 3 February 1925. On 15 November 1934, when the Daito Line had linked up with the Kyudai Main Line further west, JGR designated the station as part of the Kyudai Main Line. With the privatization of Japanese National Railways (JNR), the successor of JGR, on 1 April 1987, the station came under the control of JR Kyushu.

Passenger statistics
In fiscal 2015, there were a total of 6,393  boarding passengers, giving a daily average of 18 passengers.

See also
 List of railway stations in Japan

References

External links
Onigase (JR Kyushu)

Railway stations in Ōita Prefecture
Railway stations in Japan opened in 1915